Warner Theatre or Warner Theater may refer to:

Australia
Warner Theatre, Adelaide, built as Majestic Theatre in 1916, now demolished

United Kingdom
Vue West End in Leicester Square, London, from 1938 to 1981 known as The Warner Theatre

United States
 Hollywood Pacific Theatre, formerly the Warner Hollywood Theatre, Los Angeles, California
 Mark Strand Theatre, later RKO Warner Twin Theatre, New York City
 Powers Auditorium, previously Warner Theatre, Youngstown, Ohio
 Warner Grand Theatre, an historic movie palace located in San Pedro, Los Angeles, California
 Warner Theatre (Erie, Pennsylvania)
 Warner Theatre (Morgantown, West Virginia)
 Warner Theatre (Torrington, Connecticut)
 Warner Theatre (Washington, D.C.)
 Warner Theater (West Chester, Pennsylvania)